AEW Fyter Fest is an annual professional wrestling event produced by All Elite Wrestling (AEW). The event was established by the promotion in 2019 and is held during the summer; the first event was held in June but moved to July in 2020. The name, slogan, and logo of the event are a parody of the fraudulent Fyre Festival. The inaugural 2019 event was held as a special event, while the 2020 and 2021 events were held as a two-part special of AEW's weekly television program, Wednesday Night Dynamite. In 2022, the event was expanded to being broadcast as a four-part special, encompassing the two-week broadcasts of Dynamite and Friday Night Rampage.

The inaugural event was held in co-sponsorship with Community Effort Orlando (CEO) at the Ocean Center in Daytona Beach, Florida. It aired for free on B/R Live in North America and on pay-per-view (PPV) internationally. The second event was planned to air on PPV from the United Kingdom, but due to the COVID-19 pandemic, it took place at Daily's Place in Jacksonville, Florida, which began the event's annual broadcast as special episodes of the company's weekly television programs.

History
The inaugural Fyter Fest event took place on June 29, 2019, at the Ocean Center in Daytona Beach, Florida in co-sponsorship between All Elite Wrestling (AEW) and Community Effort Orlando (CEO). It was AEW's second-ever event and was held as part of CEO's fighting game event that year. This inaugural event aired for free on B/R Live in North America and on pay-per-view (PPV) internationally. The name, slogan, and logo were a parody of the fraudulent Fyre Festival. It was also the second wrestling event to be co-sponsored by CEO, after the previous year's New Japan Pro-Wrestling (NJPW) event, CEOxNJPW: When Worlds Collide. Both the NJPW and AEW events with CEO came as a result of Kenny Omega, a former prominent wrestler of NJPW who became a wrestler and Executive Vice President of AEW following the founding of the latter in January 2019.
 
A second event was held in 2020, though was produced by AEW alone. AEW had originally planned to host this second event at Wembley Arena in London, England, United Kingdom in June that year; it would have been the promotion's United Kingdom debut. However, the event was moved to Daily's Place in Jacksonville, Florida due to the COVID-19 pandemic, which began in March that year. This second event was also originally to air on PPV but was changed to being a two-part special of AEW's weekly television program, Wednesday Night Dynamite; the first part aired live on July 1 while the second part was pre-recorded on July 2 and aired on tape delay on July 8.

The 2021 event was announced to also be held as a two-part special of Dynamite. With AEW's return to live touring during the pandemic, the two nights took place in two different Texas markets as the second event of AEW's "Welcome Back" tour. The first night was held on July 14, 2021, at the H-E-B Center at Cedar Park in Cedar Park, Texas (Austin market) with the second night airing on July 21, 2021, from the Curtis Culwell Center in Garland, Texas (Dallas–Fort Worth market).

The 2022 event was expanded to be held as a four-part television special, encompassing the two-week broadcasts of Dynamite and Friday Night Rampage—AEW's secondary television program that began airing in August 2021. The July 13 episode of Dynamite was notable for a match between Jake Hager of the Jericho Appreciation Society and Claudio Castagnoli of the Blackpool Combat Club; both men previously wrestled for WWE as Jack Swagger and Cesaro, respectively, as a tag team named The Real Americans.

Events

See also
List of AEW pay-per-view events
List of All Elite Wrestling special events
List of AEW Dynamite special episodes
List of AEW Rampage special episodes

Notes

References

External links
All Elite Wrestling Official website

 
Recurring events established in 2019